"Goin' Back" (also recorded and released as "Going Back") is a song written by Gerry Goffin and Carole King in 1966.  It describes the loss of innocence that comes with adulthood, along with an attempt, on the part of the singer, to recapture that youthful innocence.  The song has been recorded by many artists, including Dusty Springfield, Goldie Zelkowitz, the Byrds, Elkie Brooks, Blerta, Ricky Ross (of Deacon Blue), Marianne Faithfull, Bill Drummond (of the KLF), Nils Lofgren, Freddie Mercury (on a Larry Lurex single), the Move, the New Seekers, the Pretenders, Diana Ross, Richard Thompson, Phil Collins, The Icicle Works, Bon Jovi, and Bruce Springsteen, as well as by Carole King herself.

Dusty Springfield's version
Although Goldie (of Goldie & the Gingerbreads) was the first artist to record the song, her version was withdrawn following disagreements with Goffin and King over the song's lyrics.  Carole King then decided to record "Goin' Back" herself, but ultimately she offered it to Dusty Springfield instead.  Springfield went on to have an international hit with the song and it is considered one of the best known versions.

Springfield's version of "Goin' Back" was recorded on June 15, 1966 at Philips Studios, Stanhope Place, London, with musical accompaniment by Peter Knight and production by Johnny Franz.  It was released as a single on July 1, 1966, reaching number 10 in the UK Singles Chart, but was not released as a single in the U.S.

Although "Goin' Back" was not included on any of Dusty Springfield's studio albums during the 1960s, it can be found on a number of her compilations, including Greatest Hits, Goin' Back: The Very Best of Dusty Springfield, Songbooks, Complete A and B-sides: 1963–1970, Live at the BBC, and the UK version of Golden Hits.

Chart history (Dusty Springfield)

The Byrds' version
The Byrds' recording of "Goin' Back" was released as a single on October 20, 1967 and reached number 89 on the Billboard Hot 100, but failed to chart in the United Kingdom.  The song was also included on the Byrds' 1968 album, The Notorious Byrd Brothers. The track has a subtle country feel to it; a sound the Byrds would later explore more prominently on their Sweetheart of the Rodeo album.

The band's decision to record "Goin' Back" led to tensions within the group, principally due to rhythm guitarist David Crosby's lack of enthusiasm towards the song. Crosby considered "Goin' Back" to be lightweight fluff, typical of the Brill Building style of songwriting.  He was therefore dismayed to find that his own song, "Triad", was in direct competition with "Goin' Back" for a place on The Notorious Byrd Brothers. Ultimately, Crosby was fired from the band and "Goin' Back" was included on the album and released as a single.

Cash Box said of the single that it is "soft, slow blues ballad material with combined folk and electronic frosting" with "sweet harmony into the vocal end and serves up the usual grade-A guitar sound."

It has been erroneously claimed by some critics that the version of "Goin' Back" found on the Byrds' single release is a completely different take to the one that appeared on The Notorious Byrd Brothers album.  However, an examination of the Byrds' recording session logs by Johnny Rogan reveals that, in fact, the single version is the same take as the version found on the album.  The single version does feature a slightly different mono mix, which may have been the cause of this confusion.

In addition to the original release, the mono single mix of "Goin' Back" has appeared on the 1982 compilation album The Original Singles: 1967–1969, Volume 2, the 2002 compilation LP The Columbia Singles '65-'67,<ref>{{cite web|title=The Columbia Singles '65-'67 |publisher=Sundazed Records |url=http://www.sundazed.com/product_info.php?products_id=571 |access-date=2009-08-19 |url-status=dead |archive-url=https://web.archive.org/web/20110727185820/http://www.sundazed.com/product_info.php?products_id=571 |archive-date=2011-07-27 }}</ref> and the 2012 Japanese CD Original Singles A's & B's 1965–1971.

In addition to its appearance on The Notorious Byrd Brothers album, the Byrds' recording of "Goin' Back" can be found on several Byrds' compilations, including The Byrds' Greatest Hits Volume II, History of The Byrds, The Original Singles: 1967–1969, Volume 2, The Byrds, The Very Best of The Byrds, There Is a Season, and the UK version of The Best of The Byrds: Greatest Hits, Volume II.   Additionally, an early, alternate version of "Goin' Back" was included as a bonus track on the 1997 Columbia/Legacy reissue of The Notorious Byrd Brothers.

Other cover versions
Carole King released her own recording of "Goin' Back" on her 1970 album Writer, and later re-recorded the song for her Pearls: Songs of Goffin and King album in 1980.

The New Seekers recorded and released a folk rock version of "Goin' Back" as part of their 1973 album Now. The track featured band member Peter Doyle as the lead vocalist on this, his last album with the group.

Additionally, "Goin' Back" was recorded by Freddie Mercury in 1973, featuring guitar by Brian May and drums by Roger Taylor, and was released under the pseudonym Larry Lurex.

Nils Lofgren recorded "Goin' Back" on his first eponymous solo album in 1975 and it has been a signature tune for his live shows ever since.

Bruce Springsteen and the E Street Band covered "Goin' Back" in concert during a four night stint at The Roxy in Los Angeles on October 15–19, 1975. It can be heard on the recording of the October 18 early show that was released as part of Springsteen's live archive series on December 7, 2018.

"Goin' Back" was also recorded by Elkie Brooks on her 1982 album Pearls II, and by Diana Ross on her Love & Life: The Very Best of Diana Ross album in 2001.

In 1983, Renée Geyer and Glenn Shorrock released a live version as a single from Geyer's live album, Renée Live. The song peaked at number 65 on the Australian Kent Music Report.

In 1986, The Icicle Works released a version on their EP Seven Horses Deep, under the song title “Going Back”.

The Pretenders recorded a version for the soundtrack of the 1997 film Fever Pitch.

In 2011, Irish footballer Paul McGrath covered "Goin' Back" as part of an album of cover versions, with a percentage of the album's proceeds going to the Acquired Brain Injury Foundation and the Cystic Fibrosis Foundation of Ireland.

"Goin' Back" has also been recorded by Eydie Gormé (album: It Was a Good Time, 1971), Johnny Logan (album: Straight From the Heart,  1985), Marianne Faithfull (album: Horses and High Heels'', 2011), and by Phil Collins in 2010.

References

1966 singles
1967 singles
2010 singles
Dusty Springfield songs
The Byrds songs
Phil Collins songs
Renée Geyer songs
Songs written by Carole King
Songs with lyrics by Gerry Goffin
1966 songs
Song recordings produced by Johnny Franz
Philips Records singles
Atlantic Records singles
Song recordings produced by Gary Usher
Carole King songs